Aerial warfare in the 2022 Russian invasion of Ukraine began at dawn of 24 February, with infantry divisions and armored and air support in Eastern Ukraine, and dozens of missile attacks across Ukraine. The first fighting took place in Luhansk Oblast near Milove village on the border with Russia at 3:40 am Kyiv time. The main infantry and tank attacks were launched in four spearhead incursions, creating a northern front launched towards Kyiv, a southern front originating in Crimea, a south-eastern front launched at the cities of Luhansk and Donbas, and an eastern front. Dozens of missile strikes across Ukraine also reached as far west as Lviv.

Missile attacks and air war
On 24 February, Russian forces attacked the Chuhuiv air base, which housed Bayraktar TB2 drones. The attack caused damage to fuel storage areas and infrastructure. The next day, Ukrainian forces attacked the Millerovo air base. On 27 February, Russia reportedly fired 9K720 Iskander missiles from Belarus at the civilian Zhytomyr Airport. Many Ukrainian air defense facilities were destroyed or damaged in the first days of the invasion by Russian air strikes. In the opening days of the conflict, Russia fired many cruise and ballistic missiles at the principal Ukrainian ground-based early warning radars, thereby blinding the Ukrainian Air Force to their air activity. Craters in the operating surfaces at the major Ukrainian air bases hindered Ukrainian aircraft movements, and several Ukrainian long-range S-300P surface-to-air missile batteries were destroyed.

On 1 March, Russia and the US established a deconfliction line to avoid any misunderstanding that could cause an unintentional escalation. Russia lost at least ten aircraft on 5 March. On 6 March, the General Staff of the Armed Forces of Ukraine reported that 88 Russian aircraft had been destroyed since the war began. However, an anonymous senior US defense official told Reuters on 7 March that Russia still had the "vast majority" of its fighter jets and helicopters that had been amassed near Ukraine available to fly. After the first month of the invasion, Justin Bronk, a British military observer, counted the Russian aircraft losses at 15 fixed-wing aircraft and 35 helicopters, but noted that the true total was certainly higher. In contrast, according to the United States, 49 Ukrainian fighter aircraft were lost by 18 March.

On 11 March, US officials said that Russian aircraft launched up to 200 sorties a day, most not entering Ukrainian airspace, instead staying in Russian airspace. On 13 March, Russian forces conducted multiple cruise missile attacks on a military training facility in Yavoriv, Lviv Oblast, close to the Polish border. Local governor Maksym Kozytskyy reported that at least 35 people had been killed in the attacks. The poor performance of the Russian Air Force has been attributed by The Economist to Russia's inability to suppress Ukraine's medium-range surface-to-air missile (SAM) batteries and Russia's lack of precision-guided bombs. Ukrainian mid-range SAM sites force planes to fly low, making them vulnerable to Stinger and other shoulder-launched surface-to-air missiles, and lack of training and flight hours for Russian pilots renders them inexperienced for the type of close ground support missions typical of modern air forces. On 5 May, Forbes magazine reported that Russians had continued air attacks and "continue to send Su-24 and Su-25 attack planes on treetop-level bombing runs targeting Ukrainian positions."

On 14 March, Russian forces conducted multiple cruise missile attacks on a military training facility in Yavoriv, Lviv Oblast, close to the Polish border. Local governor Maksym Kozytskyy reported that at least 35 people had been killed. On 18 March, Russia expanded the attack to Lviv, with Ukrainian military officials saying initial information suggested that the missiles which hit Lviv were likely air-launched cruise missiles originating from warplanes flying over the Black Sea. On 16 May, US defense officials say that in the previous 24 hours Russians fired long-range missiles targeting military training facility near Lviv.

By June 2022, Russia had not achieved air superiority, having lost around 165 of its combat aircraft over Ukraine which amounted to approximately 10% of its frontline combat strength. Western commentators noted the qualitative and quantitative advantages the Russian Air Force had over its Ukrainian counterpart, but attributed the poor performance of Russian aviation to the extensive ground-based anti-aircraft capabilities of the Ukrainians.

An attack on Dnipro proper was carried out by Russian armed forces on 15 July 2022. As a result, 4 people died and 16 were injured. The main target was the largest space plant of Ukraine located within the city. The city was struck by Kh-101 missiles launched from Tu-95 aircraft in the northern part of the Caspian Sea. According to preliminary data, eight missiles were launched, of which four were shot down by the Ukrainian Air Defence Forces. Each missile costs 13 million dollars (8 missiles cost Russia more than 100 million dollars).

Part of the rockets hit the "Pivdenmash" enterprise. As a result of the impact, the city's water supply was damaged, and part of the city's residents were left without water supply. More than ten cars were damaged, doors and windows were destroyed in residential buildings. Four people were killed. One of the victims was a city bus driver. On the first day, 15 wounded were reported, and the next day their number increased to 16.

In August the USAF was able to integrate AGM-88 HARM missiles into the Ukrainian Su-27s and MiG-29s. This effort has taken "some months" to achieve. This does not give the Ukrainian air force the same "capabilities that it would on an F-16." However, US Air Force General James B. Hecker said: "Even though you don't get a kinetic kill … you can get local air superiority for a period of time where you can do what you need to do."

On 19 September, US Air Force General James B. Hecker said that 55 Russian military aircraft had been shot down by Ukrainian air defenses since the start of the invasion. He credited this success to the Ukrainian use of SA-11 and SA-10 air defense systems. As the US does not have these systems, getting new missiles from European allies is a "big ask" from Kyiv. Russian airplanes increased their operations in response to the 2022 Ukrainian Kharkiv Oblast counteroffensive. The tally of downed aircraft increased to 55 when the UK MoD stated that it believed that some four Russian jets had been downed by Ukraine over the previous 10 days. These losses were due to changing front lines (Russia's loss of controlled territory) and other factors. Also, Russian aviation resources were under pressure to provide closer support to ground forces. As of 19 September, the Ukrainian Air Force was at "about 80%" of its pre-invasion strength after seven months of combat.

On 28 February 2023, the Ukrainian military attacked the port of Tuapse with two uncrewed aerial vehicles (UAVs) causing a large fire at the Rosneft oil terminal.

Casualties in Poland

On 15 November 2022, During Russia's attack on the Ukrainian Power Grid, missiles crossed the Poland border, killing 2 people in Przewodów.

Russian strikes against Ukrainian infrastructure

Russia launched about 85 to 100 missiles at a number of Ukrainian cities. The recent strategic bombing campaign has caused severe shortages of electricity and water in multiple cities. According to Ukraine's Operational Command South, Ukrainian rocket and artillery units attacked Russian positions on the left bank of the Dnipro River and in the area of the Kinburn Spit.

According to the Ukrainian Air Force, 77 of 96 Russian missiles were shot down. A Pentagon official claims the Russian plan is to exhaust the Ukrainian air defenses. At one stage some 50 missiles were in combat “within minutes” near the Polish border. Ukrainian officials report that electricity has already been restored to "nearly 100%" of Ukraine. President Zelenskyy said that about half of the Ukrainian electricity infrastructure has been hit and some 10 million people are still without power.

See also

List of aircraft losses during the Russo-Ukrainian War
Proposed no-fly zone in the 2022 Russian invasion of Ukraine

References

External links
Ukraine air war examined: A glimpse at the future of air warfare. The Atlantic Council

 
2022 Russian invasion of Ukraine